Callan is an  1974 British thriller film directed by Don Sharp and starring Edward Woodward, Eric Porter and Carl Möhner.

It was based on the pilot episode of the ITV television series Callan which ran from 1967 to 1972.

Plot
David Callan (Edward Woodward), a leading intelligence agent/assassin in the employment of the S.I.S., was forced into retirement when he lost his nerve. Now, he is called back into service to handle the assassination of Schneider, a German businessman. Colonel Hunter (Eric Porter), his former employer, promises Callan that he'll be returned to active status as long as he follows his orders. But Callan refuses to act until he knows exactly why Schneider has been marked for death...

Cast
 Edward Woodward as David Callan  
 Russell Hunter as Lonely  
 Eric Porter as Charles Hunter  
 Peter Egan as Toby Meres  
 Carl Möhner as Rudolph Schneider  
 Catherine Schell as Jenny  
 Kenneth Griffith as Waterman  
 Michael Da Costa as The Greek 
 Veronica Lang as Liz  
 Clifford Rose as Dr. Snell  
 David Prowse as Arthur
 Don Henderson as George  
 Nadim Sawalha as Padilla  
 David Graham as Wireless operator  
 Yuri Borienko as Security porter

Production
The script by James Mitchell is based on his original TV pilot "A Magnum for Schneider" and the novelization thereof, Red File for Callan, although only the novel is listed in the film's credits (as A Red File for Callan). The film was based more on the novel than on the original television script.

Callan's boss Hunter is played by Eric Porter, and Meres too is re-cast, this time played by Peter Egan. The only recurring actors from the TV series were Edward Woodward as Callan, Russell Hunter as Lonely, and Clifford Rose as Dr Snell.
 
Callan was the first film with a Dolby-encoded optical soundtrack.

The film was shot at Lee Studios. Director Don Sharp called it "a joy to film" in part because Woodward's "character was so set but he came to it so fresh again."

Reception
Sharp said the film received "lovely notices".

The Observer called it "surprisingly enjoyable".

References

External links

Callan at BFI
Callan at Letterbox DVD

1974 films
1970s spy action films
1970s action thriller films
British spy films
British action thriller films
Films based on television series
Films directed by Don Sharp
British spy action films
1970s English-language films
1970s British films